The Mutharaiyar dynasty was a royal south Indian Royal dynasty that governed the Thanjavur, Trichy and Pudukottai regions between 600 and 850 CE.

Origin

The origin of the Mutharaiyar is shrouded in mystery. Historian T. A. Gopinatha Rao equates them with the Kalabhras as Suvaran Maaran, a prominent 8th century Mutharaiyar king of Thanjavur is styled KalavaraKalvan in one of his inscriptions. Few historians like Rao read the epithet it as KalabhraKalvan interchanging the letter v with b. This has led some Tamil historians to postulate that the Mutharayar invaded kingdoms in Tamilakkam (now part of Tamil Nadu) around the 2nd century CE from Erumainadu(bison country), which is identified with the area in and around modern Mysore in Karnataka.

History

They seem to have established themselves as lords of the Thanjavur district in Tamilakkam around seventh century CE. The most famous of the Mutharaiyar dynasty were Perumbidugu Mutharaiyar, also called Kuvavan Maaran, his son Maaran Parameswaran, alias Ilangovadiaraiyan, and the latter's son Perumbidugu Mutharaiyar II, alias Suvaran Maaran. An inscription of Suvaran Maaran is found in Sendalai, a village in Thanjavur district. The record is dated to eight century CE and refers to Suvaran Maaran as the king of Thanjavur and the lord of Vallam. Suvaran Maaran seems to have held sway as far as Thondaimandalam in the north as the Jain acharya Vimalachandra from Sravanabelagola is said to have visited the court of Suvaran Maaran alias Shatrubayankaran of Thondaimandalam and challenged the Saivas, Kapalikas, Pasupatas and Buddhists. The Sendalai epigraph gives Suvaran Maaran the epithets, Satrukesari(lion to enemies) and Vēl-Maaran among others and describes his flag as having the Vēl (Vēl-kodiyaan) or lance for emblem.

During the 7th to 8th centuries, they served as feudatories of the Pallavas but at times asserted their independence and governed on their own. An inscription in the Vaikuntha Perumal temple in Kanchipuram mentions a Mutharaiyar chief receiving Nandivarman II Pallavamalla at the latter's coronation. According to historian T. A. Gopinatha Rao, this chief was Perumbidigu Muthurayar II, who is styled as Kalavara Kalvan in this epigraph. According to historian Mahalingam, he fought along with Udayachandra, the Pallava general of Nandivarman II, in at least twelve battles against the Cheras and Pandyas. When the Cholas came to power in 850, Vijayalaya Chola wrested control of Thanjavur from the Mutharaiyar and turned them into vassals.

The northern branch
In the northern dominions, the Kalamalla inscription (575 AD) that is considered as the first stone record in Telugu refers to the donor as Chola Maharaja Dhananjaya Erikal Muthuraju.  Muthuraju is but a variant of Muthuraja and Mutharaiyar. Erikal is the region identified with the Nidugal area in Tumkur district. Dhananjaya's father was Nandivarman Chola who was a descendant of Karikala Chola. Dhananjaya's son was the more illustrious Mahendravikrama referred in records as the Chola Maharaja while his grandson was Erikal Muthuraju Punyakumara the donor of the Malepadu plates, the records that describe the raising of the banks of the Kaveri by Karikala. Erikal Muthuraju Dhananjaya had two brothers namely Sundarananda and Simhavishnu. The ninth century chief (about 850AD) Adhiraja Srikantha who is described as an independent sovereign and as the lord of Mylapore (Mylaikkon) was a descendant of Sundarananda. It is of interest to note that in the Anbil plates of Sundara Chola, chief Srikantha is mentioned as the immediate predecessor of Vijayalaya Chola, the founder of Imperial Chola line. However the plates do not mention the relationship between Vijayalaya Chola and Srikantha.

During the reign of Rajaraja Chola III around 1243 AD, there was an officer called Mallan Sivan alias Brahmadaraya Mutharaiyan, referred to as pillai (son). He was the holder of the royal fief (arasukuru) and the governor of Urattur-nadu.

The relation, if any between the Thanjavur branch and Erikal Mutturaju Chola branch is not clear.

Religion 

Historians like Arunachalam and Burton Stein, have held the view that the Mutharaiyar were initially Jains and were later converted to Hinduism. Vijayalaya Choleeswaram in Narthamalai, a panchayat town in Pudukottai district in the South Indian state of Tamil Nadu,India, is a temple dedicated to the Hindu god Shiva. Constructed in the Dravida style and rock cut architecture, the temple is believed to have been built during the 9th century by Mutharaiyar kings. The other portions of Narthamalai houses the 8th century Jaina Abode, the Aluruttimalai Jain Caves. There are also two rock-cut caves, one of which houses twelve life size sculptures of Vishnu. The temple is considered one of the oldest stone temples in South India.

Literature 
Two stanzas (200, 296) of Nālaṭiyār, a Jain work of ancient Tamil literature that is often referred to as Vellalar Vēdham (the sacred scripture of the Vellalar), is dedicated to Perumbidugu Mutharaiyar. They refer to his grand feasts and wealth. Another work called Muttolaayiram which is part of the Tamil anthology lauds the exploits of the Mutharaiyar chieftains. Yet another work that is now lost is the Mutharaiyar kovai which is mentioned in the commentary of Yaapparungalam.

References

Pudukkottai state

Dynasties of India
Empires and kingdoms of India
Hindu dynasties
Tamil monarchs
Jain empires and kingdoms
Jain dynasties